Raghu Rai (born 1942), is an Indian photographer and photojournalist. He was a protégé of Henri Cartier-Bresson, who appointed Rai, then a young photojournalist, to Magnum Photos in 1977.

Rai became a photographer in 1965, and a year later joined the staff of The Statesman, a New Delhi publication. In 1976, he left the paper and became a freelance photographer. From 1982 until 1992, Rai was the director of photography for India Today. He has served on the jury for World Press Photo from 1990 to 1997. He is known for his books, Raghu Rai's India: Reflections in Colour and Reflections in Black and White.

Early life
Rai was born in the village of Jhang, Punjab, British India (now in Pakistan). He was the youngest of four children.

Career
Rai started learning photography in 1962 under his elder brother Sharampal Chowdhry, better known as S Paul who is a photographer, and in 1965 joined "The Statesman" newspaper as its chief photographer. 
He and his fellow journalist Saeed Naqvi visited maharishi’s ashram in the spring of 1968 when The Beatles arrived. Rai left "The Statesman" in 1976 to work as picture editor for "Sunday," a weekly news magazine published in Calcutta. Impressed by an exhibit of his work in Paris in 1971, Henri Cartier-Bresson nominated Rai to join Magnum Photos in 1977.

Rai left "Sunday" in 1980 and worked as a Picture Editor/Visualizer/Photographer of "India Today" during its formative years. From 1982 to 1991, he worked on special issues and designs, contributing picture essays on social, political, and cultural themes.

Rai has specialised in extensive coverage of India. He has produced more than 18 books, including Raghu Rai's Delhi, The Sikhs, Calcutta, Khajuraho, Taj Mahal, Tibet in Exile, India, and Mother Teresa. His photo essays have appeared in many magazines and newspapers including Time, Life, GEO, The New York Times, Sunday Times, Newsweek, The Independent, and the New Yorker.

For Greenpeace, he has completed an in-depth documentary project on the chemical disaster at Bhopal in 1984, which he covered as a journalist with India Today in 1984, and on its ongoing effects on the lives of gas victims. This work resulted in a book, Exposure: A Corporate Crime and three exhibitions that toured Europe, America, India and southeast Asia after 2004, the 20th anniversary of the disaster. Rai wanted the exhibition to support the many survivors through creating greater awareness, both about the tragedy, and about the victims – many who are still uncompensated – who continue to live in the contaminated environment around Bhopal.

In 2003, while on an assignment for Geo Magazine in Bombay City, he switched to using a digital Nikon D100 camera "and from that moment to today, I haven't been able to go back to using film."

He has served three times on the jury of the World Press Photo and twice on the jury of UNESCO's International Photo Contest.

In 2017, Avani Rai, his daughter followed her father on one of his trips to Kashmir to get an insight into his life and know him better. She documented this journey and released a documentary on it called Raghu Rai: An Unframed Portrait. It depicts a historical narrative through Raghu Rai's photographs through time, as he tells some of his unique experiences that not only affected him deeply but also important landmarks in the young yet crucial history of India. It was executive produced by Anurag Kashyap.

Awards
 Padmashree in 1972 for work on Bangladesh War
 Photographer of the Year from USA (1992)
Academie des Beaux Arts Photography Award - William Klein 2019
Lifetime Achievement Award by the information and broadcasting (I&B) ministry 2017

Exhibitions

1997 Retrospective – National Gallery of Modern Art, New Delhi, India.
2002 Raghu Rai's India – a Retrospective, Photofusion, London
2002 Volkart Foundation, Winterthur, Switzerland
2003 Bhopal – Sala Consiliare, Venice, Italy; Photographic Gallery, Helsinki, Finland
2003 Exposure: Portrait of a Corporate Crime – University of Michigan, Ann Arbor, USA
2004 Exposure – Drik Gallery, Dhaka, Bangladesh; Leica Gallery, Prague, Czech Republic
2005 Bhopal 1984–2004 – Melkweg Gallery, Amsterdam, Netherlands
2005 India – Musei Capitolini Centrale Montemartini, Rome, Italy
2007 Rencontres d'Arles festival, France
2012 My India – FotoFreo, Australia
 2013 Trees (Black and white), New Delhi
2014 In Light of India: Photography by Raghu Rai, Hong Kong International Photo Festival, Hong Kong
2015 Trees, Art Alive Art Gallery, Delhi
2016, The Greatest Photographs of Raghu Rai, Ojas Art, New Delhi

Collections
Bibliothèque nationale de France, Paris

Books
1974 A Day in the life of Indira Gandhi, Nachiketa Publications, India
1983 Delhi: A Portrait, Delhi Tourist Development Corporation/Oxford University Press,   India/UK
1984 The Sikhs, Lustre Press, India
1985 Indira Gandhi (with Pupul Jayakar), Lustre Press, India
1986/87 Taj Mahal, Times Editions, Singapore; Robert Laffont, France; Rizzoli Publications, USA
1988 Dreams of India, Time Books International, Singapore; (L'Inde), Arthaud, France
1989 Calcutta, Time Books International, India
1990 Delhi and Agra (with Lai Kwok Kin and Nitin Rai), Hunter Publications, Inc., USA
1990/91 Tibet in Esilio, Mondadori, Italy; (Tibet in Exile), Chronicle Books, USA
1991 Khajuraho, Time Books International, India
1994 Raghu Rai's Delhi, Indus/Harper Collins, India
1996/01  Dreams of India, Times Editions, Singapore/Greenwich, UK 
1996 Faith and Compassion: The Life and Work or Mother Teresa, Element Books, USA. 
1997 My Land and Its People, Vadehra Gallery, India
1998 Man, Metal and Steel, Steel Authority of India, Ltd., India
2000 Raghu Rai... in his Own Words, Roli Books, India
2000 Lakshadweep, UT of Lakshadweep, India
2001 Raghu Rai's India – A Retrospective, Asahi Shimbun, Japan
2002 Bhopal Gas Tragedy (with Suroopa Mukherjee), Tulika Publishers, India
2003/04  Saint Mother: A Life Dedicated, Timeless Books, India;Mère Teresa), La Martinière, France
2004 Exposure: Portrait Of A Corporate Crime, Greenpeace, Netherlands
2004 Indira Gandhi: A Living Legacy, Timeless Books, India
2005 Romance of India, Timeless Books, India
2005 Mother Teresa: A Life of Dedication, Harry N. Abrams, USA. 
2008 Raghu Rai's India: Reflections in Colour, Haus Books. 
2010 India's Great Masters: A Photographic Journey into the Heart of Classical Music
 2011 The Indians: Portraits From My Album, Penguin Books. .
 2013 Bangladesh: The Price of Freedom, Niyogi Books. 
 2013 Trees, PHOTOINK, India
2014 The Tale of Two: An Outgoing and an Incoming Prime Minister
2014 Vijayanagara Empire: Ruins to Resurrection, Niyogi Books.

References

External links

Raghu Rai at Magnum Photos
Rai's feature about Mumbai on Magnum
Invisible Interview: Raghu Rai, India, Accompanying photo essay, The Magical Streets of Raghu's India at Invisible Photographer Asia
Raghu Rai: Interview at The Guardian

Indian photojournalists
1942 births
Living people
Magnum photographers
Street photographers
20th-century Indian photographers
Recipients of the Padma Shri in arts
Indian portrait photographers
Indian male journalists
Punjabi people
People from Jhang District
20th-century Indian journalists
21st-century Indian photographers
Pakistani photojournalists